Almut Sturm (born 7 April 1941), known as Almut Gfroerer after marriage, is a German former tennis player.

Sturm, national singles champion in 1963, was a member of West Germany's 1969 Federation Cup team, featuring in two singles rubbers. She had a win over Canada's Andrée Martin, then was beaten by Winnie Shaw in West Germany's quarter-final loss to Great Britain.

During the 1960s she won several titles on tour, including in Israel and Nice.

References

External links
 
 

1941 births
Living people
West German female tennis players